The Erdai Art Hall is an art center in Magong City, Penghu County, Taiwan.

History
Originally, the Penghu County Government donated a piece of land to Mr. Erdai for the construction of the art center. The art center was opened on 28 September 1990 after being constructed with a cost of NT$10 million. In 1995, Mr. Erdai passed away and the building was taken over by the Cultural Affairs Bureau of the county government and renovated into an art memorial hall.

Architecture
The art center building was constructed on a 990 m2 area of land. It consists of two floors, including one basement area.

Exhibitions
The art center consists of two exhibition areas, which are the indoor area and outdoor area. The indoor area displays Mr. Erdai's various art works, including paintings poetry, literature etc. The outdoor area displays his poetry, sculptures and stones engraved with articles.

See also
 List of tourist attractions in Taiwan

References

External links

 

1990 establishments in Taiwan
Arts centres in Taiwan
Buildings and structures completed in 1990
Buildings and structures in Penghu County